Aminobacter carboxidus  is a bacterium from the genus Aminobacter which has been isolated from soil in Moscow in Russia.

References

Further reading

External links
Type strain of Carbophilus carboxidus at BacDive -  the Bacterial Diversity Metadatabase

Phyllobacteriaceae
Bacteria described in 1948